Slovnaft is an oil refining company in Slovakia. The company, located in Bratislava, is a subsidiary of MOL Group.

History
Slovnaft is the successor of the Apollo company. Apollo was established in 1895 in Bratislava. Its refinery was bombarded by the Allies in June 1944. Bratislava Apollo Bridge built over Danube is in proximity to the Apollo refinery historical site. The Slovnaft refinery started to be built in 1949.

On 1 May 1992, Slovnaft was reorganized as a joint-stock company, as successor to a state enterprise formed by the Czechoslovak Republic government on 1 January 1949.

Acquisition of Benzinol, its domestic competitor, took place in 1995.

Since 2000, Slovnaft has been affiliated with the MOL Group.

Operations

Refining
Slovnaft refines 5.5 to 6 million tonnes of crude oil per annum and produces a broad range of motor fuels, fuel oils and petrochemical products.

Petrochemicals

Slovnaft Petrochemicals, s.r.o., represents the Petrochemicals Division of Slovnaft Group. It produces polymers which are base materials with a broad range of uses.

Fuel retail

Slovnaft operates 208 filling stations across the Slovak Republic and offers motor fuels and a broad range of other goods, as well as additional services through this retail network.

Power generation
CM European  Power Slovakia, s.r.o., a Slovnaft Subsidiary, produces electricity, heat, and power.

Sponsorship
Slovnaft is a sponsor of the senior league competition since 2007.  The largest ice hockey arena in Bratislava is named Slovnaft Arena. It is the main partner of the Slovak Cup, now named Slovnaft Cup.

See also
Transpetrol AS, Slovak oil pipeline company, operator of the Slovak section of the Druzhba pipeline

References

Companies based in Bratislava
Energy companies established in 1949
Oil and gas companies of Slovakia
Oil refineries in Slovakia
Companies of Czechoslovakia
Slovak brands
1949 establishments in Slovakia